Eli Kent (born 1988) is a New Zealand playwright and actor.  Kent holds a Masters in Scriptwriting from Victoria University of Wellington's International Institute of Modern Letters.

Awards
2015 – Auckland Theatre Company Patrons Fellowship
2011 – Arts Foundation of New Zealand New Generation Award
2010 – Bruce Mason Playwriting Award
2008 – Peter Harcourt Award for Outstanding New Playwright
2008 – Chapman Tripp Theatre Awards

Plays
Rubber Turkey
The Intricate Art of Actually Caring
Thinning
Black Confetti
All Your Wants and Needs Fulfilled Forever

References 

1988 births
Living people
21st-century New Zealand dramatists and playwrights
International Institute of Modern Letters alumni
21st-century New Zealand male writers
New Zealand male dramatists and playwrights
21st-century New Zealand male actors